Alireza Arta (born February 4, 1997, in Kerman) is an Iranian footballer who plays as defender for the Persian Gulf Pro League club Gol Gohar Sirjan.

International career

U20
He is part of Iran U–23 during 2018 AFC U-23 Championship qualification.

References

External links 
 

1997 births
Living people
Iranian footballers
Persian Gulf Pro League players
Association football defenders
Iran youth international footballers
Sanat Mes Kerman F.C. players
People from Kerman